The Lion Rock Tunnel on the MTR Tuen Ma line is a  transport tunnel in Hong Kong. It was opened on 14 February 2020.

References

Railway tunnels in Hong Kong